Genzkow is a village and a former municipality in the district Mecklenburgische Seenplatte, in Mecklenburg-Vorpommern, Germany. Since May 2019, it is part of the town Friedland.

References 

Former municipalities in Mecklenburg-Western Pomerania